Nuttadaj Vachirarattanawong (born on 9 October 1987), nicknamed Boat, is a Thai Muay Thai and boxing promoter. He is Petchyindee Academy Promotion owner.

Biography
He is Virat Vachirarattanawong's first child and he has a younger sister. He graduated from Saint Gabriel's College and Assumption University.

Muay Thai presenter
 SUK MUAY MANS WAN SUK
 SUK PETCH YIN DEE
 SUK YOD MUAY THAI TOR BOR BOR 5

References

Living people
Nuttadaj Vachirarattanawong
Nuttadaj Vachirarattanawong
Nuttadaj Vachirarattanawong
Thai television personalities
Nuttadaj Vachirarattanawong
Nuttadaj Vachirarattanawong
1987 births
Nuttadaj Vachirarattanawong
Boxing managers